The Waimiri-Atroari or Uaimiris-Atroari are an indigenous group inhabiting the southeastern part of the Brazilian state of Roraima and northeastern Amazonas, specifically the Waimiri Atroari Indigenous Territory. They call themselves Kinja people.

They are part of the Carib people, whose historical territory is located in the south of the current state of Roraima and Amazonas.

During the 19th century, they were known as the Crichanás, when expansionary segments of surrounding Brazilian people made first contact with them.

References

External links
Waimiri-Atroari

Waimiri-Atroarí language

Carib people
Indigenous peoples in Brazil
Indigenous peoples of the Amazon